Myoxocephalus tuberculatus is a species of marine ray-finned fish belonging to the family Cottidae, the typical sculpins.  The species is endemic to the Sea of Okhotsk. It is a demersal fish that lives near the bottom, and has been found on sand and mud substrates in harbours, bays and estuaries, at depths less than 100 m.

References

tuberculatus
Fish described in 1922
Fish of Japan
Fish of Russia